Urve Palo (born 10 July 1972) is an Estonian economist and politician, a member of the Social Democratic Party.

Palo was born in Haapsalu. From April 2007 until May 2009, she served as Estonian Minister of Population and Ethnic Affairs. She also served as the Minister of Entrepreneurship in Taavi Rõivas' second cabinet from 9 April 2015, but resigned on 31 August while being disappointed with the coalition with the Reform Party.

In November 2016, the coalition led by Rõivas fell apart and a new coalition was formed by Center Party, SDE and IRL. On 23 November 2016, Palo was nominated as the Minister of Entrepreneurship and Information Technology. Palo continued in her position until July 2018, when she submitted her resignation while stating that she would leave politics at the end of her term in Riigikogu.

In 2010, Palo participated as a celebrity contestant on the fourth season of Tantsud tähtedega, the Estonian version of Dancing with the Stars. Her professional dancing partner was Aleksandr Makarov.

References

1972 births
Living people
20th-century Estonian economists
Government ministers of Estonia
21st-century Estonian politicians
21st-century Estonian women politicians
Women government ministers of Estonia
Members of the Riigikogu, 2011–2015
Members of the Riigikogu, 2015–2019
Women members of the Riigikogu
University of Tartu alumni
People from Haapsalu
21st-century Estonian economists